Deraz Ab (also Romanized as Derāz Āb; also known as Derāz and Derazū) is a village in Kharturan Rural District, Beyarjomand District, Shahrud County, Semnan Province, Iran. At the 2006 census, its population was 102, in 25 families.

References 

Populated places in Shahrud County